The 2021 NASCAR Pinty's Series is the fifteenth season of the Pinty's Series, the national stock car racing series in Canada sanctioned by NASCAR. It began with the Frontline Workers 125 at Sunset Speedway on August 1 and concluded with the Pinty's Fall Brawl at Delaware Speedway on September 26.

Jason Hathaway entered the season as the defending drivers' champion. Louis-Philippe Dumoulin won the championship, his third in the series after previously winning the 2014 and 2018 titles.

Drivers

Schedule
On 4 February 2021, NASCAR announced the 2021 schedule. It included an inaugural race at Ohsweken Speedway, which would have become the first dirt track race in series history, after being cancelled for the 2020 season Due to the ongoing Covid-19 pandemic, the season's start was delayed and multiple races were cancelled.

Results and standings

Races

Drivers' championship

(key) Bold – Pole position awarded by time. Italics – Pole position set by final practice results or Owners' points. * – Most laps led.

See also
 2021 NASCAR Cup Series
 2021 NASCAR Xfinity Series
 2021 NASCAR Camping World Truck Series
 2021 ARCA Menards Series
 2021 ARCA Menards Series East
 2021 ARCA Menards Series West
 2021 NASCAR Whelen Modified Tour
 2021 NASCAR Whelen Euro Series
 2021 eNASCAR iRacing Pro Invitational Series
 2021 SRX Series

References

External links
 
Pinty's Series Standings and Statistics for 2021

Pinty's Series